Pump That Body is a 1990 dance single by American producer/remixer, Mr. Lee.  The single was Mr. Lee's highest entry on the dance charts, hitting number one for one week.  "Pump That Body" did not chart on any other American chart.

Chart performance

Weekly charts

Year-end charts

References

1990 songs
1990 singles
American house music songs
Jive Records singles